Galip Balkar (1936 – 11 March 1983) was a Turkish diplomat. He was assassinated by two Armenian gunmen in 1983 during his duty as the Turkish ambassador to Yugoslavia.

Life and career
Galip Balkar was born in 1936 in Istanbul. He graduated from Ankara University, Law School. In 1959, he joined the Ministry of Foreign Affairs. He was appointed the Ambassador of Turkey to Yugoslavia in 1981.

Assassination

Two Armenian gunmen opened fire with small firearms at the ambassador's car, which stopped for a red light at a major downtown intersection in Belgrade. Balkar, 47, and his chauffeur Kaya Necet were wounded, the condition of the ambassador being critical. Two Yugoslav security agents in the area chased them and shots were exchanged. The gunmen wounded one of the agents, Slobodan Brajević. Another shot aimed at Brajević had ricocheted off a wall and slightly wounded an office worker, Zorica Solotić. A Yugoslav student, Željko Milivojević, was killed during the exchanged gunfire.

The attackers were arrested and identified as Harutyun Krikor Levonian and Alexander Elbekyan. They had arrived in Yugoslavia from Beirut on 6–7 March and both held Lebanese passports. Levonian, seriously wounded, was caught shortly after the attack, and Elbekyan eight hours later. The same day, an anonymous caller to The Associated Press in Athens took responsibility for the attack on behalf of the Justice Commandos of the Armenian Genocide a militant organization that was blamed for at least a dozen attacks on Turkish targets from 1975 to 1987. Callers to other news outlets in Paris and Beirut also said the Justice Commandos had carried out the assault. The messages said the shooting was intended to draw the world's attention to what the group called "the national problem of the Armenian people."

See also
 Assassination of Galip Balkar
 List of assassinated people from Turkey
 List of Turkish diplomats assassinated by Armenian militant organisations

References 

1936 births
1983 deaths
Diplomats from Istanbul
Assassinated Turkish diplomats
Turkish people murdered abroad
People murdered in Yugoslavia
Ankara University Faculty of Law alumni
Ambassadors of Turkey to Yugoslavia